The Ambassador of Australia to Kuwait is the Australian Government's foremost diplomatic representative in Kuwait. The Ambassador is an officer of the Australian Department of Foreign Affairs and Trade and the head of the Embassy of the Commonwealth of Australia to the State of Kuwait. The position has the rank and status of an Ambassador Extraordinary and Plenipotentiary.  The current ambassador, since 21 November 2017, is Jonathan Gilbert. 

While the Australian Embassy in Kuwait City has been open since 23 December 2004, Kuwait and Australia have enjoyed diplomatic relations since 1974, when the inaugural Ambassador to Saudi Arabia in Jeddah received non-resident accreditation for Kuwait.

List of ambassadors

References

Australia
 
Kuwait